The Omahola project consists of several uraniferous magnetite deposits (Ongolo, Inca, MS7) located in the western part of Namibia in Erongo Region. Ongalo represents a uranium resource having estimated 17,400 tU in ore grading 0.036% uranium.

References 

Uranium mines in Namibia